William George Harris, 2nd Baron Harris KCH (19 January 1782 – 30 May 1845) was a British soldier and peer.

Life

Harris was the son of General George Harris, 1st Baron Harris.

He fought under his father during the siege and capture of Seringapatam in 1799 at the age of 17. He later became a Lieutenant-General in the British Army and commanded the 73rd Regiment of Foot at the Battle of Waterloo in 1815. He succeeded his father in 1829 to the barony and the family seat of Belmont House and Gardens near Faversham in Kent.

He was given the colonelcy of the 86th Foot from 1832 to 1835 and his old regiment, the 73rd Foot, from 1835 to his death.

Lord Harris died in May 1845, aged 63. He had married Isabella Helana Handcock-Temple of Waterstown, Co. Westmeath on 28 May 1824. She was obliged by a previous will to continue the Temple name. William George Harris moved into Waterstown House after the wedding. He was succeeded in the barony by his son George.

His great-grandson is Michael Marriott.

Arms

References

Kidd, Charles, Williamson, David (editors). Debrett's Peerage and Baronetage (1990 edition). New York: St Martin's Press, 1990.

|-

|-

1782 births
1845 deaths
Barons in the Peerage of the United Kingdom
Eldest sons of British hereditary barons
British Army lieutenant generals
British military personnel of the Fourth Anglo-Mysore War
British Army personnel of the Napoleonic Wars
73rd Regiment of Foot officers